The Cypriot records in swimming are the fastest ever performances of swimmers from Cyprus, which are recognised and ratified by the Cyprus Swimming Federation.

All records were set in finals unless noted otherwise.

Long Course (50 m)

Men

Women

Short Course (25 m)

Men

Women

Notes

References
General
Cyprus Records 3 March 2023 updated
Specific

External links
Cyprus Swimming Federation

Cyprus
Records
Swimming